Juan Miranda may refer to:
Juan Miranda (baseball) (born 1983), Cuban baseball player
Juan Miranda (runner) (1928–?), Argentine middle-distance runner
Juan Miranda (swimmer) (born 1968), Salvadoran swimmer and Salvadorian Olympian
Juan Carreño de Miranda (1614–1685), Spanish baroque painter
Juan Fernández Miranda (born 1974), Argentine rugby player
Juan Paredes  (born 1953), Mexican Olympic boxer
Juan Miranda, main character in 1971 film Duck, You Sucker!
Juan Q. Miranda (1912–1985), Filipino politician
Juan Miranda (footballer) (born 2000), Spanish footballer
Juan Miranda (hammer thrower), Chilean hammer thrower and champion at the 1959 South American Junior Championships in Athletics